Alanis Guillen Caratella  (born 20 May 1998) is a Brazilian actress.

Biography 
Alanis Guillen Caratella, born May 20, 1998, is the daughter of an architect mother and an engineer and musician father. She started her career participating in commercials as a child, having been hired by brands such as Nestlé, Marisa, Nextel and Mercado Livre. Then, as a teenager, she took free courses in theater and dance, and later graduated in performing arts. Her debut on television took place at the age of 21, as the protagonist Rita in Malhação: Toda Forma de Amar, shown between 2019 and 2020. In 2021, she was chosen to play the character Juma Marruá, in the adaptation of the telenovela Pantanal, produced by TV Globo. His preparation for the role involved archetypal study, table study, changing habits, Kung Fu practice, riding lessons, prosody lessons, among other activities.

Personal life 
Alanis declares herself a feminist and says she doesn't like labels like heterosexual or bisexual, preferring to "connect with people". In addition, she is an environmental activist and used Instagram to criticize the government of Jair Bolsonaro and fascism. She is an amateur athlete, practicing Muay Thai routinely. On social media, the actress shares posts praising the woman and her femininity. "Long live women and the feminine energy that exists in everyone," she wrote in the caption of a video in which she appears imitating a snake, published in November 2020.

Alanis has a fluid sexuality.

Filmography

Television

Awards and nominations

References

External links 
 

1998 births
Living people
Actresses from Santo André
Brazilian female models
LGBT actresses
Brazilian LGBT actors
21st-century Brazilian actresses
21st-century LGBT people
Sexually fluid women